Brazil–Chile relations refers to interstate relations between Brazil and Chile. Chile and Brazil have acted numerous times as mediators in international conflicts, such as in the 1914 diplomatic impasse between the United States and Mexico, avoiding a possible state of war between those two countries. More recently, since the 2004 Haiti rebellion, Chile and Brazil have participated in the United Nations Stabilization Mission in Haiti, which is led by the Brazilian Army.

According to a 2014 BBC World Service Poll, 62% of Chileans view Brazil's influence positively, with only 12% expressing a negative view.

History

During much of the 19th and the 20th centuries, conflicts with Argentina over Uruguay and Paraguay on behalf of Brazil and over Patagonia on behalf of Chile made Brazil and Chile close allies. During the War of the Pacific, with Chile fighting against Peru and Bolivia, Brazil provided tacit support for Chile, and forced Argentina, which attempted to join the Peruvian–Bolivian alliance, to stay neutral throughout the war.

On May 20, 1914, Argentina, Brazil and Chile (the ABC countries) met in Niagara Falls, Canada, to mediate diplomatically to avoid a state of war between the United States and Mexico over the Veracruz Incident and the Tampico Affair.

On May 15, 1915, the three met again to sign a more formal treaty. The Consultation, Non-Aggression, and Arbitration Pact was designed to foment co-operation, non-aggression and the arbitration of disputes. It was formulated to resist American influence in the region and to establish a mechanism for consultation among the three signatory countries, such as by setting up a permanent mediation commission.

Alliance

Military alliance
 ABC countries along with Argentina

See also
ABC countries
Foreign relations of Brazil
Foreign relations of Chile
South American dreadnought race

References

Goliath: Brazil and Chile relations

External links
Ministry of Foreign Relations of Chile Official website 
Brazilian Embassy in Chile Official website 

 
Chile
Bilateral relations of Chile